K. Raveendra Kumar is a member of the Telugu Desam Party (TDP). On 15 March 2018 he was elected unopposed to the Rajya Sabha from the state of Andhra Pradesh.

References

Living people
Telugu Desam Party politicians
Rajya Sabha members from Andhra Pradesh
1956 births